The Palm VIIx was a personal digital assistant made by Palm, Inc. The device featured an antenna used for wireless data communication. Connectivity was provided through the Mobitex network under the now defunct Palm.net service. Web Clipping applications used the network to process data. The cost of service was $14.95 per month and allowed a limited number of web pages to be viewed.

The Palm VIIx succeeded the original Palm VII. It was replaced by the Palm i705.

External links
 Palm Sets the Pace with Enhanced Wireless Palm VIIx handheld, Palm Press Release, Aug. 7, 2000

Computer-related introductions in 2000
Palm OS devices
68k-based mobile devices